Mario Biondi (born Mario Ranno, on 28 January 1971) is an Italian singer.

Born in Catania, Italy, Biondi is the son of a popular song singer, and sang in various small choirs during his youth. Years after he accompanied Franco Califano, Peppino Di Capri, Fred Bongusto, Rosario Fiorello and others on their Concert tours. After a long series of collaborations with Italian and international artists, as well a small production of disco music, he achieved success in 2006 with the Schema Records album Handful of Soul. His deep and warm voice recalls the great interpreters of soul and rhythm and blues music. In 2007, he released a double disc containing live material, entitled I Love You More LIVE. In 2010 he released a live album Yes You (Live) and followed that in 2011 with a double CD album Due. In 2013, Biondi released a new album SUN and Mario Christmas. On 5 May 2015 Mario has published a brand new record: Beyond, featuring songs such as "Love is a temple".

Discography

2006: Handful of Soul
2007: I Love You More (Live)
2010: If
2010: Yes You (Live)
2011: Due
2013: Sun
2013: Mario Christmas
2015: Beyond
2016: Best of Soul
2018: Brasil
2021: Dare
2022: Romantic

External links

Official Site
Schema Records
Mario Biondi's Facebook
Mario Biondi's MySpace
'This Is What You Are': video and lyrics
L'Huffington Post 'Musica: Mario Biondi presenta Sun, "un disco per celebrare la vita" (VIDEO)' dated 29 January 2013
"Sun", e Mario Biondi vola nel mondo sulle ali del soul dated 5 February 2013

1971 births
Living people
Musicians from Catania
Schema Records artists
Soul singers
Italian rhythm and blues singers
Italian basses
21st-century Italian male  singers
English-language singers from Italy